Empire of the Ants is a 1977 science fiction horror film co-scripted and directed by Bert I. Gordon. Based very loosely on the 1905 short story "Empire of the Ants" by H. G. Wells, the film involves a group of prospective land buyers led by a land developer, pitted against large mutated ants.

It is the third and last film released in A.I.P.'s H.G. Wells film cycle, which include The Food of the Gods (1976) and The Island of Dr. Moreau (1977).

Plot

The opening narration briefly introduces the viewer to the ant and its behavior. It takes note how ants use pheromones to communicate, and how they cause an obligatory response that must be obeyed. "But we (humans) don't have to worry about it..." As the opening credits roll, barrels of radioactive waste are being dumped off a boat into the ocean. Eventually, one of the barrels washes up on the shore and begins to leak a silvery goo attractive to the local ants, which are seen feeding on it.

Meanwhile, shady land developer Marilyn Fryser (Joan Collins) takes a bunch of new clients to view some 'beachfront property' on a nearby island. In reality, the land is worthless, but the trip is cut short by the group stumbling upon the lair of large ants. The ants destroy their boat and chase the group through the woods. Fleeing for their lives through the wilderness and losing many of their party along the way, the remaining survivors eventually discover the local island town. But their safety is short-lived when they realize that not only are the large ants feeding on the sugar at the local sugar factory, but that they are doing so at the invitation of the humans. The queen ant, using pheromones, has the entire town completely under her control. However, the survivors manage to escape and burn the sugar factory, killing the large ants, and leave the island by a speedboat.

Cast
 Joan Collins as Marilyn Fryser
 Robert Lansing as Dan Stokely
 John David Carson as Joe Morrison
 Albert Salmi as Sheriff Art Kincade
 Jacqueline Scott as Margaret Ellis 
 Pamela Susan Shoop (as Pamela Shoop) as Coreen Bradford
 Robert Pine as Larry Graham
 Edward Power as Charlie Pearson
 Brooke (daughter of Jack) Palance as Christine Graham
 Tom Fadden (in his last role before his death in 1980) as Sam Russell
 Harry Holcombe as Harry Thompson
 Irene Tedrow as Velma Thompson

Production

Special effects
As with most Bert I. Gordon films, the director himself oversaw most of the special effects. To create the effect of large ants, the director often used the technique of process shots, where close-up images of live ants were combined with images of the actors on set, reacting to the menacing insects. Another more crude effect used by Gordon was one he borrowed from his previous film Beginning of the End, where he would place live insects in a miniature set lined with still photographs of the location and let them crawl around. The shortcomings of this technique were highlighted in a scene where the ants are climbing the outside of a sugar refinery, and some of them appear to suddenly crawl off the building and walk vertically into the sky. When the film called for actors to be attacked by the ants, large rubber mock-ups were used, which were animated by crew members who wiggled the gigantic props in front of the camera. Joan Collins later said she did not like working with the ant props, as they bumped and scratched the actors, including herself.

Filming
Principal photography took place on location in the Florida Everglades and St. Lucie and Martin Counties in Florida during the fall of 1976. Filming in a remote swampland sometimes proved to be problematic, and was particularly taxing for the women because their restrooms were approximately a half-hour away by speedboat. Actress Pamela Susan Shoop recalls that "because it was a half-hour each way, when we went to the bathroom, they had to wait an hour. It was a mess, but the shoot was fun". Another problem with the location was dealing with the unpredictable wildlife. According to actor Robert Pine, there was one scene where the actors had to fall out of a rowboat and into the river, where there were apparently live alligators. The director had previously promised that a cage would be installed to protect the actors, but for some unknown reason the cage never arrived. Also, even though they were filming in Florida, the autumn weather ended up sending temperatures to freezing levels. At one point, the cold weather was so bad that it caused Shoop's jaw to dislocate during one of her screaming scenes and she had to be sent to the hospital to be treated.

Reception

Joan Collins received a nomination for Best Actress for her lead role in this film at the 5th annual Saturn Awards.

References

Further reading
 Weaver, Tom (2010). "Robert Pine on Empire of the Ants (1977)". Sci-Fi Swarm and Horror Horde: Interviews with 62 Filmmakers. McFarland. . pp. 382–385.

External links

 
 
 

1977 films
1977 horror films
1970s American films
1970s English-language films
1970s science fiction horror films
1970s monster movies
American International Pictures films
American science fiction horror films
American natural horror films
Fictional ants
Films about ants
Films based on short fiction
Films based on works by H. G. Wells
Films directed by Bert I. Gordon
Films set in Florida
Films set on islands
Films shot in Florida
Giant monster films